Amy Ellen Richlin (born December 12, 1951) is a professor in the Department of Classics at the University of California Los Angeles (UCLA). Her specialist areas include Latin literature, the history of sexuality, and feminist theory.

Early life 
Born in Hackensack, New Jersey on December 12, 1951, to parents Samuel Richlin and Sylvia Richlin, her grandparents all immigrated to the US from Lithuania and Belarus. Neither of her parents were in the classic field with her father pursuing careers in music, poetry and butchery and her mother being a typist and secretary, most notably to Manie Sacks.

Academic career 
Richlin studied at Smith College, then transferred to Princeton University in 1970, graduating in 1973 as part of the first co-ed class to study there, where she then went on to found The Princeton University Women's Crew and then studied for her PhD at Yale University writing her dissertation on "Sexual Terms and Themes in Roman Satire and Related Genres". Since 1977, she has taught at Rutgers University (1977–1979), Dartmouth College (1979–1982), Lehigh University (1982–1989), and the University of Southern California (1989–2005), before moving to the University of California at Los Angeles. She retired from the University of California at Los Angeles after 45 years of teaching in 2022.

Published works
Her first book was The Garden of Priapus: Sexuality and Aggression in Roman Humor (1983; rev 1992). She developed the theme in collected works including Pornography and Representation in Greece and Rome (1992), and Feminist Theory and the Classics (co-edited with Nancy Sorkin Rabinowitz, 1993). She has publicly cited Australian classical scholar Suzanne Dixon as a great influence in shaping her work on gender politics. Richlin was the first to publish the word 'fuck' in the journal Classical Philology.

In Rome and the Mysterious Orient, Richlin translated three works – Curculio, Persa and Poenulus – by the Roman playwright Plautus (notably using "references taken right out of American pop culture" to make Plautus more understandable to modern audiences). For example, the conventionally translated text:

The lover that first set out on the highways of love with an empty purse went in for harder labours than Hercules

was translated by Richlin as:

The dude who first set out to go on the road of love without no dough, / this guy had to go through way more shit than all them Labors of Hercules."

Her translation of Plautus' Rudens was adapted in a play Tug of War performed at the Getty Villa in 2007.

Richlin also engaged on a long-term project on the amatory letters of the young Marcus Aurelius and his teacher, Cornelius Fronto, with Marcus Aurelius in Love published in 2007.

Awards and achievements 

 ACLS Travel Grant (1987)
 National Endowment for the Humanities Fellowship (1987-1988)
 Women's Classical Caucus Prize (1992)
 Mortar Board Faculty of the Month (September, 1995) 
 USC Associate Award for Excellence in Teaching (1996)
 ACLS Fellowship (2003-2004)
 Visiting Membership of High Table, Newnham College, Cambridge (2004)
 Loeb Foundation Fellowship (2010-2011)
 Lambda Classical Caucus Rehak Award (2011)
 Women's Classical Caucus Leadership Award (2017)

References

Yale University alumni
University of California, Los Angeles faculty
American feminist writers
Living people
American classical scholars
Women classical scholars
Smith College alumni
Princeton University alumni
Rutgers University faculty
Dartmouth College faculty
Lehigh University faculty
University of Southern California faculty
1951 births
Classical scholars of the University of California, Los Angeles